Paul N. "Chip" Jaenichen is an American retired United States Navy officer who served as the Administrator of the United States Maritime Administration from July 25, 2014 to January 13, 2017.

Early life and education 
Jaenichen is a native of Brandenburg, Kentucky, where he attended Meade County High School. Both of his parents had served in the United States Army. Jaenichen earned a Bachelor of Science degree in ocean engineering from United States Naval Academy and Master of Science in engineering management from Old Dominion University.

Career 
Jaenichen primarily served on submarines during his 30-year career with the United States Navy, including the USS Skipjack, USS Oklahoma City, the USS Baton Rouge and the USS Key West. He served as the executive officer of the USS Kentucky from 1994 to 1996. He also served as the commander of Submarine Squadron 11 in San Diego, and deputy chief of legislative affairs for the United States Department of the Navy.

In 2013, Jaenichen was selected to serve as acting United States Maritime Administration by President Barack Obama, succeeding David T. Matsuda. Jaenichen had previously served as deputy administrator under Matsuda since 2012. He was later nominated to serve as the permanent administrator. During his tenure, he advocated for the "revitalization" of the United States Merchant Marine. He also provided testimony to the United States Senate Committee on Commerce, Science, and Transportation, United States House Agriculture Subcommittee on Livestock and Foreign Agriculture, and United States House Transportation Subcommittee on Coast Guard and Maritime Transportation. He left office in 2017, and was succeeded by Mark H. Buzby.

In 2017, Jaenichen joined Liberty Global Logistics LLC as executive vice president.

References 

Living people
United States Department of Transportation officials
Obama administration personnel
People from Brandenburg, Kentucky
United States Naval Academy alumni
Old Dominion University alumni
Year of birth missing (living people)